The Yukon Liquor Corporation regulates the distribution, purchase and sale of alcoholic beverages in the Canadian territory of Yukon.

The Corporation came into existence in 1977 as a result of amendments to the Liquor Act. It currently operates six liquor stores and a central facility in Whitehorse.

External links
Yukon Liquor Corporation

Canadian provincial alcohol departments and agencies
Alcohol in Yukon
Retail companies established in 1977
Companies based in Whitehorse
Alcohol monopolies
Alcohol distribution retailers of Canada
1977 establishments in Yukon
Cuisine of Yukon